Baztan (or Baztán) may refer to:

Baztan (comarca) in Navarre, Spain
Baztan (river) in Navarre, Spain
Baztan, Navarre in Navarre, Spain
Nuevo Baztán, a settlement in the Community of Madrid, Spain